"Turn Me On" is a song by French DJ David Guetta from his fifth studio album Nothing but the Beat. Vocals are provided by rapper and singer Nicki Minaj, whose second studio album Pink Friday: Roman Reloaded features the song as a bonus song on its deluxe version. It was written by Ester Dean, David Guetta and Giorgio Tuinfort, with a rap written by Minaj, and is lyrically about addiction.

The song has garnered mixed to favorable responses from music critics, who complimented Minaj's appearance on the track, while also dismissing the Auto-Tune used on Minaj's vocals. It has been chosen as the fifth official single from Nothing but the Beat. It impacted U.S. Top 40/Mainstream and Rhythmic radio on 13 December 2011. A remixes EP was released in January 2012 internationally and in February 2012 in the US and Canada. The song also marks Guetta's best-peaking single in the United States, tied with "Without You" which also peaked at 4 on the Billboard Hot 100. The song was briefly used to promote WWE WrestleMania XXVIII. As of December 2014, the song has sold 2.6 million copies in the United States.

Background
 "Turn Me On" was written by Ester Dean, David Guetta, and Giorgio Tuinfort. An additional rap was written by Nicki Minaj for the song. On an interview with Billboard, David Guetta said: "I am so proud of what Nicki did on this record because we know her for those crazy raps but the other record that we have, she is singing like—oh man. The world is gonna be shocked. Because they don't know her like this" "And we came up with that amazing song and she just killed it."

Composition

"Turn Me On" is an EDM song and features Minaj on vocals. It is the second track from Nothing but the Beat that features Minaj, along with the single "Where Them Girls At". The song is written in the key of C minor, with a simple chord sequence of C minor-Bb major-Ab major. It is written in common time with a moderate dance groove of 128 beats per minute. Nicki Minaj's vocals span from G3 to E5 in the song.

Critical reception 

Al Fox of BBC Music wrote that "the best results come when Guetta mercilessly rips artists from their comfort zone – take Minaj in songbird mode on 'Turn Me On." Allmusic's David Jeffries wrote that "Nicki Minaj does a pole dance on the operating table for 'Turn Me On', while picking it as one of the best tracks on the album. Carol Cooper of Village Voice gave a review talking about her voice, writing that "on 'Turn Me On' Nicki Minaj gamely shifts between her Madonna range and her Rihanna register." Ken Capobianco somewhat echoed the same thought of Cooper, writing that " Nicki Minaj delivers solid singing on the track."

Joe Copplestone of PopMatters wrote a mixed review, saying that "the song showcases a suspiciously melodic performance by Minaj, with massive hooks that somehow let her make the transition from freak to diva."  Harley Brown of Consequence of Sound thought that the "skipping beat and screaming synths are more recognizable as quintessential techno." Genevieve Koski of The A.V. Club was more negative, writing that on the song Minaj is a "faceless-disco-diva." Another negative review came from Idolator's Becky Bain, who dismissed "Guetta's decision to take one of the most exciting rapper's today and not only have her not rap, but drown her in Auto-Tune."

Music video

Development
The music video for "Turn Me On" was filmed in November 2011 by director Sanji. A sneak preview of the video was released on 27 January 2012 with the full video being released on 31 January.

Synopsis

Set in a steampunk world, Guetta plays a mad scientist creating his very own Nicki Minaj from mechanical parts. The clip opens on Guetta, perhaps trying out some early cosmetic-surgery tactics, putting the final touches on his Minaj doll plans. Then it focuses on the mechanisms behind the Nicki being: latex lips, brass wiring, tubing and various other gizmos. As the song hits the chorus for the first time, fans get a view of his creation. Her plastic skin is shiny and completely bare as she slowly transforms into the very human-looking Nicki. Seemingly pleased with his creation, Guetta unleashes it onto the world. The entrance to the second verse shows Minaj, dressed in a long black dress, black top hat and shocking pink hip-length hair, leaving Guetta's studio through two black gates and is now free to roam the streets, filled with other doll-like creatures who can't help but stare at Guetta's incredibly lifelike creation. With Minaj continuing her journey through town, the other jealous doll creatures make their way to Guetta's lab, where he begins to work on them too, giving them more lifelike appearances. The female creatures then discover that he is a doll himself, however, his interior resembles chainmail. The female dolls then start to feel him. Meanwhile, Nicki is surrounded by the male dolls as she belts out the song. As the video finishes, Minaj is spotted riding her horse around town, as the female dolls make their escape from Guetta's place of business.

Live performances
Guetta and Minaj performed together at the American Music Awards of 2011 as the opening act, with the duo performing "Turn Me On" and Minaj performing her hit, "Super Bass", from her debut album, Pink Friday, with an intro of "Wet" by Snoop Dogg. The song has also been performed solo by Minaj on 2012's New Year's Rockin' Eve with Ryan Seacrest, and during the 2012 NBA All-Star Game opening show. Minaj has also performed the song on her debut concert tour, the Pink Friday Tour. She has also included the song in her Pink Friday: Reloaded Tour, Pinkprint Tour and the Nicki Wrld Tour setlists.

Track listing
 Digital download – EP
 "Turn Me On" (Michael Calfan Remix) – 5:43
 "Turn Me On" (David Guetta and Laidback Luke Remix) – 5:08
 "Turn Me On" (Sidney Samson Remix) – 5:54
 "Turn Me On" (JP Candela Remix) – 7:02
 "Turn Me On" (Sabastien Drums Remix) – 6:19
 "Turn Me On" (Extended Version) – 4:37
 German CD single
 "Turn Me On" (Original Version) – 3:19
 "Turn Me On" (Michael Calfan Remix) – 5:43
 "Turn Me On" (David Guetta and Laidback Luke Remix) – 5:08
 "Turn Me On" (Sidney Samson Remix) – 5:54
 "Turn Me On" (JP Candela Remix) – 7:02
 "Turn Me On" (Sabastien Drums Remix) – 6:19
 "Turn Me On" (Extended Version) – 4:37
 12" vinyl
 "Turn Me On" (Michael Calfan Remix) – 5:43
 "Turn Me On" (JP Candela Remix) – 7:02
 "Turn Me On" (David Guetta and Laidback Luke Remix) – 5:08
 "Turn Me On" (Sabastien Drums Remix) – 6:19
 "Turn Me On" (Sidney Samson Remix) – 5:54
 "Turn Me On" (Extended Version) – 4:37

Charts

Weekly charts

Year-end charts

Certifications

Release history

See also
 List of number-one dance singles of 2012 (U.S.)

References

2011 singles
2011 songs
David Guetta songs
Nicki Minaj songs
Songs written by Nicki Minaj
Songs written by Ester Dean
Music videos directed by Sanji (director)
Songs written by Giorgio Tuinfort
Song recordings produced by David Guetta